Plasencia is a surname. Notable people with the surname include:

Alejandro D. Plascencia (born 1991), Mexican-American Citizen
Casto Plasencia (1846–1890), Spanish painter
César Plasencia, American soccer player
Jorge A. Plasencia (born 1974), American businessman
Nestor Plasencia (born c. 1950), tobacco grower and cigar maker
Rene Plasencia (born 1973), American politician
Steve Plasencia (born 1956), American long-distance runner